The VI Army Division is an operational unit of the Chilean Army based in Iquique, Tarapacá region. Its towns of jurisdiction includes the regions of Tarapacá, Arica and Parinacota.

Reference 

Chilean Army